Royal Hawaiian Center is an outdoor shopping center in the shopping district of Kalakaua Avenue in Waikiki, Oahu, in the US state of Hawaii. As of 2017, Royal Hawaiian Center had the fifth highest sales per square foot in the US.

History 
The shopping center originally opened in 1979 as part of the Royal Hawaiian Hotel complex with about 100 shops and restaurants and a food court. It was constructed as three separate buildings adjacent to each other with sky walks connecting the upper floors.  The center, owned by Kamehameha Schools at the time, completed a $100 million renovation in 2007 to include more retailers and restaurants.  The center was sold to RHC Property Holding LLC in 2013.

References 

Shopping malls in Hawaii
Shopping malls established in 1979
Waikiki